Antonio Salemme (November 2, 1892 − May 2, 1995) was an Italian-born American sculptor and painter best known for his sculpted portraits, including John F. Kennedy, Dwight D. Eisenhower, Albert Einstein, Paul Robeson, Ethel Waters, and classical nudes.

Early life and education
Salemme was born on November 2, 1892, in Gaeta, Italy. In 1904, following the death of his mother he emigrated to Boston with his father. He began to undertake the study of art at the age of 14 and then a benefactor enabled him to study sculpture in Rome in 1912. He returned to the United States after World War I and established a studio in the New York City borough of Manhattan's Greenwich Village.

In 1924, he attended a performance of The Emperor Jones starring Paul Robeson and subsequently asked the actor to model for him. The finished work, "Negro Spiritual", was displayed at the Brooklyn Museum as well as other fine art institutions. The sculpture later voyaged to a foundry in France to be cast in bronze, but was then lost during World War II.

Career
After studying in Boston and Rome, and serving in the Italian army during that conflict, Salemme settled in New York City and became involved in the Greenwich Village cultural scene of the 1920s and 1930s. Three of his sculpted portraits (Robeson, Waters, and Arctic explorer Vilhjalmur Stefansson) are in the collection of the National Portrait Gallery. His Kennedy portrait is at the John F. Kennedy Library. Salemme's life-size nude of Paul Robeson entitled "Negro Spiritual" (1926) was exhibited to acclaim in New York, Chicago, San Francisco and Paris, and became a cause celebré when it was banned from an exhibition in Philadelphia in 1930.

In the 1930s, he worked as a director in the Works Progress Administration. Salemme was the recipient of two Guggenheim Fellowships (in 1932 and 1936). In the 1940s, he became increasingly interested in painting, which he had studied as a teenager.  Salemme's annual summer visits to Rockport, Massachusetts resulted in numerous post-Impressionist-inspired sea and landscapes.

After a 43-year career in New York City, Salemme and his wife Martha moved to rural eastern Pennsylvania in 1962. In the 1980s, he and his wife Martha set up the Antonio Salemme Foundation in Allentown, Pennsylvania, as an initial step towards the founding of a museum to permanently house the artist's work.

In 2013, an Italian historical society published a selection of Salemme's letters and photographs from his military service in World War I. The artist's work was the subject of a retrospective exhibition at the Sigal Museum in Easton, Pennsylvania in 2014. Working from memory and imagination, and inspired by Hindu philosophy and his devoted practice of Zen Buddhist meditation, Salemme painted and sculpted almost up until his death at age 102.

Death
Salemme died on May 2, 1995, in Williams Township, Pennsylvania at the  age 102.

References

External links
Antonio Salemme papers at Archives of American Art at the Smithsonian Institution

1892 births
1995 deaths
20th-century American sculptors
20th-century American male artists
American centenarians
American male sculptors
Italian emigrants to the United States
Men centenarians